"Lies Greed Misery" is a song by American rock band Linkin Park. It is the fourth track from their fifth studio album, Living Things. The song was written by the band and produced by co-lead vocalist Mike Shinoda and Rick Rubin. "Lies Greed Misery" was used as a promotional single and was the reward for a scavenger hunt contest run by the band themselves, was used in promotional material for the video game Medal of Honor: Warfighter. Its working title was "Piledriver" and later "Breaking Point".

Composition
"Lies Greed Misery" is said to "highlight the band’s ability to play with genres such as hip-hop, it seems that this is as heavy as it gets." AltSounds states that the song has a "buzzing authoritative energy that you can’t help getting caught up in." Billboard says that "thick bass wobbles and programmed drums offer a bold new look for Linkin Park, as Bennington's screeching is choked out by the static." and even makes a reference to Skrillex due to the electronic beats throughout the song.

Reception
Loudwire stated that "tracks like 'Lies Greed Misery' and 'Victimized' go down like bitter pills", and commented on Shinoda's rapping, calling it "hard hitting". Rolling Stone said that the band had found its greatest inspiration in pop-wise hip-hop in this track, saying that "Lies Greed Misery" is "a sweet-and-sour gem, [...] guaranteed to make you jump."

Commercially, the song was never officially released as a single in any territory; however, it did still manage to chart on the UK Rock & Metal singles chart, peaking at number 37.

Personnel
 Chester Bennington – vocals
 Mike Shinoda – keyboards, rap vocals, rhythm guitar
 Brad Delson – lead guitar, sampler
 Dave Farrell – bass guitar, backing vocals, sampler
 Joe Hahn – turntables, samplers
 Rob Bourdon – drums, percussion

Charts

Release history

References

2012 songs
Linkin Park songs
Song recordings produced by Rick Rubin
Songs written by Mike Shinoda
Industrial rock songs